Outbreaks of methanol poisoning have occurred when methanol is used to adulterate moonshine (bootleg liquor).

Methanol is toxic to humans via ingestion due to metabolism. If as little as 10 ml of pure methanol is ingested, for example, it can break down into formic acid, which can cause permanent blindness by destruction of the optic nerve, and 30 ml is potentially fatal, although the median lethal dose is typically 100 ml (3.4 fl oz) (i.e. 1–2 ml/kg body weight) of pure methanol. This does not happen with ethanol, which breaks down into acetic acid, which is non-toxic in small amounts. Reference dose for methanol is 0.5 mg/kg/day. Toxic effects take hours to start, and effective antidotes, like ethanol, can often prevent permanent damage. Because of its similarities in both appearance and odor to ethanol (the alcohol in beverages), it is difficult to differentiate between the two.

Australia
In 2013 three people died and one suffered partial blindness when they ingested a home-made beverage containing methanol.

In 1997 two people from Central Australia died and two survived after ingesting a drink made from methanol and other alcoholic beverages.

Brazil
In 1999, 35 people died, in ten cities of the state of Bahia as a result of drinking cachaça contaminated with methanol. Further investigation revealed concentrations as high as 24.84% methanol. As other different cases have also been related, in a 20-day window there have been 450 people hospitalized with the toxicity symptoms of methanol ingestion.

Cambodia
In 2012, 49 people died, and more than 300 people were hospitalized, after drinking rice wine contaminated by methanol.

Costa Rica
25 persons died in August 2019 due to methanol poisoning.

Czech Republic

The 2012 Czech Republic methanol poisonings occurred in September 2012 in the Czech Republic, Poland and Slovakia. Over the course of several days, 38 people in the Czech Republic and 4 people in Poland died as a result of methanol poisoning and several tens of others were taken to hospital.

El Salvador
In El Salvador, as many as 122 people died in 2000 as a result of drinking low quality liquors sold in unauthorized shops that were found to be adulterated with methanol. The incident prompted the authorities to declare a 10-day emergency prohibition and a massive inspection of alcohol-vending establishments. The root cause was believed to be an act of terrorism, possibly a social cleansing campaign targeted against alcoholics, as the offending distilleries were not found to be responsible for the methanol contents that were present in the affected liquors.

Estonia

The Pärnu methanol poisoning incident occurred in Pärnu county, Estonia, in September 2001, when 68 people died and 43 were left disabled after contents of stolen methanol canisters were used in production of bootleg liquor.

India

India has a thriving moonshine industry, and methanol-tainted batches have killed over 2,000 people in the last 3 decades, including:
 1976: 100 people died in Gujarat.
 1980: 44 died in Haryana
 1981: About 308 people in Karnataka, see 1981 Karnataka liquor deaths.
 1982: 78 people killed and at least 50 injured in Vypeen alcohol poisonings at Vypin, Kerala.
 1986: 108 died in Gujarat.
 1987: 200 died in Gujarat.
 1988: 32 people died in Gujarat.
 1992: More than 200 people in Odisha, see 1992 Odisha liquor deaths.
 2001: 27 deaths in Bombay.
 2004: In December 2004, 87 people died in Mumbai.
 2006: 22 people killed in Ganjam district, Orissa.
 2008: 148 people in Karnataka & Tamil Nadu, December. see 2008 Karnataka-Tamil Nadu hooch tragedy
 2009: 27 people killed in Kolkata, West Bengal
 2009: 29 people killed in Uttar Pradesh
 2009: 136 people in Gujarat, July, see 2009 Gujarat alcohol poisonings.
 2009: >30 deaths, Delhi.
 2009: >30 deaths, Orissa Bolangir.
 2010: 35 people killed in Ghaziabad and Bulandshahr districts, Uttar Pradesh
 2010: 23 people killed in Malappuram district, Kerala
 2010: 10 deaths, Uttar Pradesh.
 2011: 17 dead in andhra Pradesh, August.
 2011: 170 people in Sangrampur, December, see Sangrampur methanol tragedy.
 2012: 17 deaths, Andhra Pradesh.
 2012: 31 deaths, Orissa.
 2012: 18 people died in Gurdaspur district of Punjab in a possible methanol-poisoning incident. The Chemical Analyzer and Histo-pathology department took care of the bodies and will ascertain the exact cause of death.
 2013: 40 people died in Azamgarh district, Uttar Pradesh.
 2015: In June 2015, more than 90 people died in Mumbai., see 2015 Mumbai alcohol poisoning incident
 2017: On 3 January at least 6 people died at Ramgopalpur, West Bengal
 2019: In February 2019, 100 people in the northern states of Uttar Pradesh and Uttarakhand died by drinking toxic alcohol.
 2019: In February 2019, just days after the Uttar Pradesh and Uttarakhand deaths (above), 156 people (mostly tea plantation workers) died in Assam state. see 2019 Assam alcohol poisonings
 2022: 2022 Gujarat Toxic Liquor deaths

Indonesia
Arak that has been laced has contributed to deaths due to methanol toxicity.

Iran
In 2013, as a result of methanol mass poisoning in Iran 694 people were hospitalised in the city of Rafsanjan. 8 people were reported dead due to severe intoxication.

During the COVID-19 pandemic in Iran, nearly 300 people died and over a thousand became ill from drinking methanol in the belief that drinking it can kill the virus in the body.

Ireland

Two men were killed in a methanol poisoning incident near to Burtonport, County Donegal, Republic of Ireland in 2014 after drinking what was claimed to be poitín (an Irish moonshine made from potatoes). One man was native Irish and the other a Lithuanian immigrant. A bottle seized at the scene of one poisoning was found to contain 97% methanol.

In 2017 a person was severely poisoned after buying "vodka" from an unlicensed seller in the Ballymun area of Dublin; the bottle had been refilled with a liquid containing methanol.

Italy
In 1986 the methanol-tainted wine scandal was a fraud perpetrated by adulterating table wine with methanol, poisoning hundred of people, with 90 hospitalized, 23 deaths, and many others heavily injured (blindness and neurological damages).

Libya
At least 51 people died in Tripoli in 2013. The consumption and sale of alcohol is illegal in Libya.

Madagascar
The Madagascar methanol mass poisoning occurred in 1998 when 200 people died.

Malaysia 
From September until October 2018, 45 people have been reported died of methanol poisoning from drinking fake liquor. In this incident, the methanol content was up to 50 times more than the permissible amount. Cases of toxic alcohol poisoning have been reported in Selangor, the Federal Territories of Kuala Lumpur and Putrajaya, Perak and Negeri Sembilan. The deaths comprised various nationalities mostly of foreign workers from Bangladesh, Indonesia, Myanmar and Nepal. Around 30 people including three Indian nationals, believed to be responsible for the distribution of cheap counterfeit liquor to retailers around Selayang and Desa Jaya which led to the methanol poisoning incident have been arrested.

Mexico

Government restrictions on liquor and beer sales during the COVID-19 pandemic may have exacerbated the problem of illegal production and sale of alcoholic beverages in Mexico. Reportedly, 35 people died in 2020 in just one mass poisoning incident due to methanol tainted drinks.

Morocco
Between September 28 and 29, 2022, 19 deaths occurred in the northern Moroccan city of Ksar El Kebir.

Nigeria
Between April 14 and April 26, 2015, 23 deaths were recorded in relation to methanol poisoning in Ayadi and Ode-Irele towns of Irele Local Government Area in Ondo State.

66 people in Rivers State died over a few weeks that started in April 2015 due to methanol-contaminated ogogoro.

Norway
Between September 2002 and December 2004, 51 people were admitted to hospital with symptoms of methanol poisoning, of whom 9 died. A further 8 people who died outside hospital were found to have died from methanol poisoning following autopsy. The liquor responsible for all of the cases contained 20% methanol and 80% ethanol and probably came from the same source in southern Europe.

Philippines
In December 2019, at least 23 people died while around 300 were hospitalized after drinking methanol-laced palm liquor, locally known as lambanog, in the provinces of Laguna and Quezon. Separate incidents of methanol poisoning involving lambanog were also reported in 2018 which caused at least 21 deaths.

Russia

In December 2016, 72 people died in a mass methanol poisoning in Irkutsk, Siberia. The poisoning was precipitated by drinking counterfeit surrogate alcohol—actually scented bath lotion that was marked as not safe for consumption. Named Boyaryshnik ("Hawthorn"), it was described by the Associated Press as being counterfeit.

In October 2021, in Orenburg, 35 people died and 33 others were poisoned in a mass surrogate alcohol poisoning. 7 people were noted as being in serious condition, and 3 people were placed on ventilators. 10 people were arrested for the incident.

Also in October 2021 18 people died and a number were poisoned in another mass surrogate alcohol poisoning in Yekaterinburg and towns nearby. Two persons were arrested.

Spain 

In 1963, methanol was used in the preparation of bottled mixed alcohol drinks such as coffee liqueur.
According official records, 51 died and 9 lost their sight, but according to newspapers there may have been thousands of victims, mainly in Galicia and the Canary Islands.

Turkey

 2004 - 21 deaths in Istanbul,
 2005 - 23 deaths in Istanbul,
 2011 - 5 Russian tourists died in the Turkish Riviera,
 2015 - 32 deaths in Istanbul, 3 deaths in Izmir.
 2020 - At least 44 deaths from bootleg drink made with methanol around the country 
 2021 - 22 deaths in Istanbul.

Uganda

In April 2010, 80 people died from multiple organ dysfunction syndrome after drinking waragi adulterated with a high amount of methanol over a three-week period in Kabale District. Many of the deaths were blamed on the reluctance of people to openly admit their relatives had been drinking it, allowing the abuse of the substance to continue. When revelations came about houses were searched, with around 120 jerrycans uncovered.

United States
In December 1963, a rash of 31 deaths in Philadelphia's homeless population was traced to a local store that knowingly sold Sterno to people for them to consume and get drunk.

In January 2016, consumption of a mixture of Mountain Dew and methanol, referred to as Dewshine, resulted in the reported deaths of two Tennessee high school students. The methanol in this case was believed to come from racing fuel.

In April 2018, a Massachusetts man died after ingesting alcohol that was contaminated with methanol. The product consumed was labeled "Ethanol Extraction 95% ethanol and 5% water". An FDA recall was issued and the company is no longer selling the product which was sold over the internet and shipped by the U.S. Postal Service.

References

External links
 Selection of Recent Methanol Outbreaks, World Health Organization

Food safety scandals
Ethanol poisoning